Ahmed Khairy may refer to:

Ahmed Khairy (athlete), Egyptian sprinter
Ahmed Khairy (footballer), Egyptian footballer
Ahmed Khairy (handballer), Egyptian handball player